The 2019 Premier Volleyball League (PVL) season was the third season of the Premier Volleyball League (16th season of the former Shakey's V-League) that started on May 26, 2019 at the Filoil Flying V Center in San Juan.

All-Star game 
Alyssa Valdez and Myla Pablo headed the two teams, blue and red, respectively. The all-star game was staged to generate funds for the benefit of the Help Educate and Rear Orphans (Hero) Foundation.

Match result
Philippines Standard Time (UTC+08:00)

|}

Reinforced conference

Participating teams

Preliminary round

Final round

Awards

Final standings

Venues

Open conference

Participating teams

Preliminary round

Final round

Awards

Final standings

Venues

Collegiate conference

Participating teams

Preliminary round

Pool A

Pool B

Final round

Awards

Final standings

See also 
2019 Spikers' Turf

References 

2019 in Philippine sport